Frederick Erickson is the George F. Kneller Professor Emeritus of Education and Anthropology at the University of California, Los Angeles.

References

Further reading

External links 

 

American anthropologists
University of California, Los Angeles faculty
Northwestern University alumni
American ethnographers
American educational theorists
University of Pennsylvania faculty
Michigan State University faculty